The 1936 United States House of Representatives elections in South Carolina were held on November 2, 1936, to select six Representatives for two-year terms from the state of South Carolina.  All five incumbents who ran were re-elected and the open seat in the 4th congressional district was retained by the Democrats.  The composition of the state delegation thus remained solely Democratic.

There was a split in the South Carolina Republican Party between the Tolbert and Seabrook factions because each side wanted to be the arbiter of the spoils system should a national Republican victory occur.  Therefore, they both offered their own slate of candidates for the federal contests and they were competing against each other, not the Democrats, to show the national Republican Party that they held more sway in the state.

1st congressional district
Incumbent Democratic Congressman Thomas S. McMillan of the 1st congressional district, in office since 1925, defeated two Republican challengers.

General election results

|-
| bgcolor="#FF3333" |
| Republican (Tolbert)
| B.L. Hendrix
| align="right" | 314
| align="right" | 1.9
| align="right" | -0.4
|-
| bgcolor="#FF3333" |
| Republican (Seabrook)
| Ben Felman
| align="right" | 193
| align="right" | 1.2
| align="right" | +1.2
|-

|-
| 
| colspan=5 |Democratic hold
|-

2nd congressional district
Incumbent Democratic Congressman Hampton P. Fulmer of the 2nd congressional district, in office since 1921, defeated Gary Paschal in the Democratic primary and defeated two Republicans in the general election.

Democratic primary

General election results

|-
| 
| colspan=5 |Democratic hold
|-

3rd congressional district
Incumbent Democratic Congressman John C. Taylor of the 3rd congressional district, in office since 1933, defeated J. Wade Drake in the Democratic primary and two Republicans in the general election.

Democratic primary

General election results

|-
| 
| colspan=5 |Democratic hold
|-

4th congressional district special election
Incumbent Democratic Congressman John J. McSwain of the 4th congressional district died on August 6, 1936, and a special election was called for November 3 to be held simultaneously with the regular election.  The South Carolina Democratic Party held a primary election that would choose their candidate for both the special and regular election.  Gabriel H. Mahon, Jr. won the primary and was unopposed in the special election to serve out the remainder of the term.

Democratic primary

General election results

|-
| 
| colspan=5 |Democratic hold
|-

4th congressional district
Gabriel H. Mahon, Jr., winner of the Democratic primary for both the special and regular election of the 4th congressional district, defeated two Republicans in the general election to win the term for the 75th Congress.

General election results

|-
| 
| colspan=5 |Democratic hold
|-

5th congressional district
Incumbent Democratic Congressman James P. Richards of the 5th congressional district, in office since 1933, defeated two Republican challengers.

General election results

|-
| 
| colspan=5 |Democratic hold
|-

6th congressional district
Incumbent Democratic Congressman Allard H. Gasque of the 6th congressional district, in office since 1923, won the Democratic primary and defeated two Republicans in the general election.

Democratic primary

General election results

|-
| 
| colspan=5 |Democratic hold
|-

See also
United States House of Representatives elections, 1936
United States Senate election in South Carolina, 1936
South Carolina's congressional districts

References

"Supplemental Report of the Secretary of State to the General Assembly of South Carolina." Reports of State Officers Boards and Committees to the General Assembly of the State of South Carolina. Volume I. Columbia, SC: 1937, pp. 7–9.

United States House of Representatives
1936
South Carolina